Mariwan also known as Qale Marīvān - "Fort Marivan"; formerly, Dezhe Shahpur (Persian: دِژ شاهپور), also Romanized as Dezhe Shāhpūr and Dezhe Shapoor)  is a town in – and the capital of – Marivan County, Kurdistan Province, Iran. At the 2006 census, its population was 51,664, in 22,440 families.

The people of Marivan speak Kurdish.

Language 
The linguistic composition of the city:

Climate

References

External links 

 Government of Marivan
 Marivan News

Towns and villages in Marivan County
Cities in Kurdistan Province
Iran–Iraq border crossings
Kurdish settlements in Kurdistan Province